UM-D is an initialism which may refer to:

University of Michigan–Dearborn
University of Minnesota, Duluth

See also
University of Maryland, often abbreviated UMD